María Elena is a Chilean town and commune in Tocopilla Province, Antofagasta Region.

History 
Maria Elena is named after Mary Ellen Comdon, the wife of the first saltpeter refinery works (oficina salitre) manager, Elias Cappelens. Originally, the name of the works was "Coya Norte". Situated on land purchased from the Treasury in 1924, the plant was opened in 1926 using a sodium nitrate extraction system patented by the Guggenheim Brothers which had replaced the Shanks system. It was laid out on the basis of the flag of the United Kingdom. Together with the former refinery at Pedro de Valdivia built in 1931, it was the largest saltpeter works with a combined output of over one million tons per year.

In 1965 both were taken over by the state, through the Sociedad Química y Minera (SQM or "Chemicals and Mining Company", which was privatized in 1980. This privatization explains why most land and buildings are owned by SQM and not by individuals or the Chilean state.

In 1996, it became the only active mining community in the country after the closure of the saltpeter works at Pedro de Valdivia, following which many workers and their families were relocated to Maria Elena.

Almost all the town's old houses collapsed or were made uninhabitable, and the local hospital also almost completely collapsed, though with no loss of life or injuries.

Demographics
According to the 1992 census of the National Statistics Institute María Elena had 7,530 inhabitants; of these, 7,412 (98.4%) lived in urban areas and 118 (1.6%) in rural areas. At that time, there were 4,298 men and 3,232 women. By 2002, the population had fallen 44.9% (124,130 persons) since the 1992 census of 13,660.

The commune of María Elena is composed of six census districts.

Source: INE 2007 report, "Territorial division of Chile"

Administration
As a commune, María Elena is a third-level administrative division of Chile administered by a municipal council, headed by an alcalde who is directly elected every four years. The 2008-2012 alcalde is Jorge Godoy Bolvarán (PS), and the council has the following members:
 Carlos Hidalgo Marfull
 Nelson Avendaño Véliz
 Jaqueline Godoy Soto
 Jorge Ramirez Plaza
 Carlos Ardiles Aceituno
 Andrés Concha F.

Within the electoral divisions of Chile, María Elena is represented in the Chamber of Deputies by Marcos Espinosa (PRSD) and Felipe Ward (UDI) as part of the 3rd electoral district, (together with Tocopilla, Calama, Ollagüe and San Pedro de Atacama). The commune is represented in the Senate by Carlos Cantero Ojeda (Ind.) and José Antonio Gómez (PRSD) as part of the 2nd senatorial constituency (Antofagasta Region).

See also
 List of Saltpeter works in Tarapacá and Antofagasta

References

External links
  Municipality of María Elena

Communes of Chile
Populated places in Tocopilla Province
Saltpeter works in Chile
1926 establishments in Chile

br:María Elena